Minder Pettway Coleman (October 11, 1903 – 16 May 1999) was an American artist. She was one of the Gee's Bend quilt-makers, along with her older sister Delia Bennett and her daughter Minnie Sue Coleman.

Life 
Coleman was an active citizen of Gee's Bend, Alabama. She was as the president of the Gee's Bend Farms agricultural cooperative, established by the Farm Security Administration in the 1930s, and was vice-president of the Freedom Quilting Bee, established in 1966. She was also a member of Gee's Bend's weaving cooperative in the 1930s.

Career 
Quilters communed and worked together at Coleman's house before the Freedom Quilting Bee was founded, so it is no wonder that Coleman worked there full-time from 1966- 1978. Along with Mattie Ross and Patsy Mosely, Coleman wove draperies 76 inches wide and 250 inches long for the Roosevelt White House. She also wove a blue- and- white striped cloth for a suit for Franklin Delano Roosevelt, of which local lore holds that he was buried in.

References 

1903 births
1999 deaths
Quilters
20th-century American women artists
20th-century African-American women
20th-century African-American people
20th-century African-American artists